Dorcaschesis sericata is a species of beetle in the family Cerambycidae, and the only species in the genus Dorcaschesis. It was described by Heller in 1924.

References

Desmiphorini
Beetles described in 1924
Monotypic Cerambycidae genera